Game, Set and Match is a 1988 television serial directed by Ken Grieve and Patrick Lau and written by John Howlett. It is based on the books Berlin Game (1983), Mexico Set (1984), and London Match (1985) by Len Deighton. The two directors worked separately on different episodes. Filmed on location in Berlin and Mexico, the project included a large international cast with 3,000 extras and a budget of $8 million. While critically acclaimed, the ratings for the series were a disaster. Ian Holm was nominated for a BAFTA award for his portrayal of Bernard Samson.

It was aired in 1989 in the United States as part of the PBS show Mystery!

Plot synopsis
The series focuses on Bernard Samson (Ian Holm), beginning with his search for the "mole" that threatens the Brahms Network in East Germany. Samson is sent to Berlin to bring out a Brahms agent. He is then sent to Mexico to try to persuade a KGB major (Gottfried John) to defect, using his childhood friend Werner Volkmann's wife Zena as bait. After it appears another traitor is working at London Central, Samson himself becomes one of the prime suspects.

Cast
Ian Holm as Bernard Samson
Mel Martin as Fiona Samson
Michael Culver as Dicky Cruyer
Michael Degen as Werner Volkmann
Gottfried John as Eric Stinnes
Anthony Bate as Bret Renssalaer
Frederick Treves as Frank Harrington
Amanda Donohoe as Gloria Kent
Hugh Fraser as Giles Trent
Gail Harrison as Tessa Kozinski
Gary Whelan as George Kozinski 
Brigitte Karner as Zena Volkmann
Alan MacNaughtan as Sir Henry Clevemore DG
Michael Aldridge as Silas Gaunt
Peter Vaughan as David Kimber-Hutchinson
Eva Ebner as Frau Lisl Hennig
Jeremy Child as Henry Tiptree

Episodes

Reception
Clifford Terry, writing for the Chicago Tribune, called the series "a crackling cloak-and-dagger thriller". He noted that "the sharp direction by Kenneth Grieve and Patrick Lau and the provocative script by Howlett... comes up a winner through an assemblage of superb performances." In TV Week, a supplement to The Philadelphia Inquirer, Lee Winfrey praised the production, calling it a "mind-bender", and singling out Gottfried John as a "mesmerizing menace", and cited Holm as "[holding] things together." Conversely, in his review for The New York Times, John O'Connor wrote "Costly and ambitious, the 13-hour production of Game, Set and Match... is a mess." He cited Ian Holm as being miscast.

Soundtrack

The soundtrack by Richard Harvey for Game, Set and Match was released on LP in 1988. Some of the music ("Game, Set and Match", "Goodbye Codes" and "The Cloisters of San Jacinto") was reissued in 2016 on Shroud for a Nightingale: The Television Drama Music of Richard Harvey. "The Bridge" and "The End Game" are available on Shroud for a Nightingale: The Screen Music of Richard Harvey.

Track list
All songs by Richard Harvey.
"Game, Set and Match"
"Wrong Side of Charlie"
"Tante Lisl - The Wings of Remembrance"
"Unter Den Linden"
"Goodbye Codes"
"Coming Home"
"The Bridge"
"Tianguis"
"Domingo's Path"
"Snakes & Ladders"
"The Cloisters of San Jacinto"
"The Hurricane Season"
"A Christmas Spy"
"A Rough Crossing"
"The Oxford Joker"
" Pulling Strings"
"The End Game"

References

External links

Pictures from the Granada TV production of Game Set & Match

1988 British television series debuts
1988 British television series endings
1980s British drama television series
ITV television dramas
Espionage television series
Television series about the Cold War
Television shows based on British novels
Television series by ITV Studios
Television shows produced by Granada Television
English-language television shows
Secret Intelligence Service in fiction